Greedhead Music is an independent record label founded by Himanshu Suri of Das Racist. Initially, Suri founded Greedhead Music as a management and recording company in 2008 to manage Das Racist. Greedhead's first releases were the group's 2010 mixtapes, Shut Up, Dude and Sit Down, Man. Das Racist's first commercially available album, Relax, was also the first commercial release on the Greedhead imprint. Greedhead has since released solo mixtapes by both Kool A.D. (The Palm Wine Drinkard and 51) and Heems (Nehru Jackets). The label has also released works by Dash Speaks, Weekend Money, Keepaway, Lakutis, Big Baby Gandhi, Le1f, Antwon, and Meyhem Lauren, as well as non-hip-hop acts like singer Safe, Scottish bhangra act Tigerstyle, and comedian Joe Mande.

On July 9, 2015, Suri announced that he would be effectively shutting down Greedhead. He claimed that the cost of releasing and promoting free releases for the label's roster left him more than $10,000 in debt. Suri added, however, that his own music would continue to be released on the Greedhead imprint.

Roster

 Bear Hands
 Big Baby Gandhi
 Das Racist
 Heems
 Joe Mande
 Kool A.D.
 Lakutis
 Le1f
 Meyhem Lauren

References

External links
 Official website (archive)

Record labels established in 2008
American record labels
Hip hop record labels